Capítulo II: Brinca (English: Chapter II: Jump) is the second studio album by Mexican-American recording artist DJ Kane. It was released on September 13, 2005 by EMI Latin.

Track listing

References

2005 albums
DJ Kane albums
EMI Latin albums
Spanish-language albums